Guittena is a town and commune in Mascara Province, Algeria.

Notable people 
 Emir Abdelkader (1808–1883)
 Emir Mustapha (1814–1863)

References

Communes of Mascara Province